"Body Movin'" is a song by American hip hop group Beastie Boys, released as the second single from their fifth studio album Hello Nasty.

Track listing
CD single
"Body Movin'" – 3:09
"Body Movin'" (Fatboy Slim Remix) – 5:33
"Peanut Butter and Jelly" – 2:16

CD single v.2
"Body Movin'" – 3:05
"Body Movin'" (Moving in Kent Mix) – 5:58
"Dr. Lee PhD" (Dub Mix) - 4:31

Composition
The song samples "Oye Como Va" by Amral's Trinidad Cavaliers and uses vocal samples from "Modern Dynamic Physical Fitness Activities" by Ed Durlacher.

Remixes
The Fatboy Slim remix has the same lyrics, but has differences in the instrumental. This remix features a sample of "Fido" by The Byrds. This song is also featured on the Beastie Boys compilation The Sounds of Science which was released in the United States.

There is also a radio remix featuring Redman, Biz Markie and Erick Sermon - utilizing the backing of the Fatboy Slim remix. This remix is also featured on the Xbox 360 game, Dance Central and the Wii dancing video game, Just Dance 2.

Music video
The music video uses the Fatboy Slim remix version and was directed by MCA, under his alias Nathaniel Hornblower. It parodies and incorporates scenes from the 1968 Italian action film Danger: Diabolik (based on the comic character Diabolik) with Ad-Rock playing the titular character, MCA playing the villain and Mike D as the villain's assistant. It was released in two versions: censored and uncensored, with the censored version replacing machine gun fire with that of a laser gun, and omitting a comedic but bloody decapitation from the uncensored version.

In popular culture
The Fatboy Slim remix of the song is briefly played in the 2013 film Star Trek Into Darkness. The song was featured in one episode of MTV animated series Daria. In Chile, the song was used the jingler winner of TVN TV Show Calle 7 in 2010–2012.  The song was featured in the Netflix docuseries Don't F**k with Cats: Hunting an Internet Killer because a featured Facebook user had named her username, "Baudi Moovan," after the song.

Chart positions

References

1998 singles
Beastie Boys songs
Fatboy Slim songs
Songs written by Ad-Rock
Songs written by Mike D
Songs written by Adam Yauch
1998 songs
1997 songs
Songs written by Mario Caldato Jr.
Song recordings produced by Mario Caldato Jr.
Songs about dancing
Music videos directed by Adam Yauch
Capitol Records singles
Grand Royal singles